Ponpethi  is a village in the  
Avadaiyarkoilrevenue block of Pudukkottai district, Tamil Nadu, India.

Demographics 

As per the 2001 census, Ponpethi had a total population of 1359 with 709 males and 650 females. Out of the total population 897 people were literate.

References

Villages in Pudukkottai district